Yukarıakpınar is a village in the Bingöl District, Bingöl Province, Turkey. The village is populated by Kurds of the Az tribe and had a population of 81 in 2021.

The hamlet of Mirzan is attached to the village.

References 

Villages in Bingöl District
Kurdish settlements in Bingöl Province